Bordertown is a western drama television series that aired 78 half-hour episodes from 1989 to 1991. It is set during the 1880s in a small town that straddles the United States and Canadian border, and law enforcement duties are shared between a U.S. Marshall and a North-West Mounted Police corporal.

The series was a co-production between Canada's Alliance Corporation and France's Tele-Image. It first aired on the American cable network The Family Channel on January 7, 1989, and was seen on Canada's CTV beginning in 1990. A 1989 newspaper article stated that contracts were being prepared for the series to air in France, Italy, and several other European countries.

Premise
A small town on the United States - Canadian border had been named Pemmican (the name of a traditional indigenous food) but when the area was surveyed it was discovered that the 49th parallel, which divides the two countries, went through the middle of the community, and bisected the law enforcement office. NWMP Corporal Clive Bennett and U. S. Marshal Jack Craddock shared the same office (divided by a painted line on the floor) and patrolled the town that is half in Alberta and half in Montana. The officers also shared an interest in Marie Dumont, the town's doctor, and owner of the general store.

In an interview series star Richard Comar stated that the "whole premise of the show is based on the border." How lawmen from two countries reacted to events showed the differences between the Canadian and American legal systems.

Production information
The series was a co-produced by Alliance Entertainment Corporation of Canada and Tele-Images of France. French directors were often used, and Sophie Barjac was hired to play a main character who come from Paris in order to broaden the series' appeal to French investors.

The town was built on a ranch east of Vancouver, Canada. Sixty-five carpenters worked for six weeks to build the half-million-dollar complex. All buildings were complete inside and out. No soundstage work was done during the filming of the series; everything was shot inside or outside of the buildings that had been constructed for Bordertown.

Effort was made to have the series look as authentic as possible. A 1989 article stated that the general store held "an array of merchandise worthy of the finest western museum." The saloon was stocked with antique bottles, and the livery stable had hundred-year-old saddles.

Cast
Richard Comar - Marshal Jack Craddock (United States lawman)
John H. Brenna - Corporal Clive Bennett (Canadian lawman)
Sophie Barjac - Marie Dumont (French-born doctor and store owner)
Beverley Elliot - Sally Duffield (owns boarding house, works in Marie's store)
Fritz Bergold - Otto Danzinger (original livery stable owner)
Duncan Fraser - Zachary Denny (Southern saloon owner)
Gregory Togal - Willie Haddon (boy befriended by Jack Craddock)
Domenico Fiore - Dominic Bertino (saloon bartender)
Paul Batten - Wendell MacWherther (banker who later bought livery stable)
Patrice Valota - Gabriel Couteau (Metis man who helps track criminals)
Sarah Sawatsky - Lucy Walker (orphaned girl adopted by Marie)

Episodes

Series overview

Season 1 (1989)

Season 2 (1990)

Season 3 (1990–91)

DVD releases
Platinum Disc Corporation released 4-volume collections of Bordertown on DVD in Region 1  between 2003-2005.  These releases have been discontinued and are now out of print.

On February 1, 2011, Echo Bridge Home Entertainment released 2 volume collections on DVD in Region 1 (US only).  These releases contain the same 28 episodes as the previous Platinum Disc releases.

On July 26, 2011, Alliance Home Entertainment released The Best of Bordertown on DVD in Canada only.  The set is exactly the same as the 4-disc set released in the US in 2005 and February 2011, even right down to the Platinum Disc Corporation logo appearing as soon as the disc boots up.

On December 12, 2012, Echo Bridge Home Entertainment released Bordertown- The Complete Series on DVD in Region 1.

On January 6, 2015 Echo Bridge Home Entertainment released Bordertown & Gold: Complete Collection on DVD.

References

External links 
 

1989 Canadian television series debuts
1991 Canadian television series endings
1980s Canadian drama television series
1990s Canadian drama television series
CTV Television Network original programming
1980s Western (genre) television series
Royal Canadian Mounted Police in fiction
Television series by Alliance Atlantis
1989 American television series debuts
1991 American television series endings
1980s American drama television series
1990s American drama television series
United States Marshals Service in fiction
1990s Western (genre) television series
The Family Channel (American TV network, founded 1990) original programming
Canadian Western (genre) television series